Axel Munthe, The Doctor of San Michele is a 1962 biographical drama film directed by Giorgio Capitani, Rudolf Jugert and Georg Marischka. It stars O.W. Fischer in the title role along with Rosanna Schiaffino, Sonja Ziemann and Valentina Cortese. It was made as a co-production between France, Italy and West Germany. It is based on the 1929 book The Story of San Michele, the memoirs of the Swedish doctor Axel Munthe.

It was shot at the Spandau Studios in Berlin and on location in Rome and Capri. The film's sets were designed by the art directors Werner Achmann and Willy Schatz. It was made in Eastmancolor. It premiered in Augsburg in September 1962.

Cast
 O.W. Fischer as Axel Munthe
 Rosanna Schiaffino as Antonia
 Sonja Ziemann as Prinzessin Clementine
 María Mahor as Ebba
 Valentina Cortese as Eleonora Duse
 Antoine Balpêtré as Leblanc
 Fernand Sardou as Petit-Piere
 Heinz Erhardt as Brunoni
 Renate Ewert as Patientin
 Ingeborg Schöner as Natasha
 Christiane Maybach as Paulette

References

Bibliography

External links 
 

1962 films
1960s biographical drama films
German biographical drama films
Italian biographical drama films
French biographical drama films
West German films
1960s German-language films
Films directed by Rudolf Jugert
Films directed by Georg Marischka
Films directed by Giorgio Capitani
Medical-themed films
Films set in the 1880s
Films set in the 1890s
Films set in the 1900s
Films set in the 1920s
Films set in Paris
Films set in Naples
Films set in Capri, Campania
Films set in Rome
Films set in Sweden
Films shot at Spandau Studios
Gloria Film films
1962 drama films
1960s German films
1960s Italian films
1960s French films
German-language French films